Shujaabad may refer to:
Shujabad, Pakistan
Shojaabad (disambiguation), places in Iran